"Hypnotized" is a song written by Bob Welch. The song originally featured on Fleetwood Mac's 1973 album Mystery To Me. The track was released on a single as the B-side of "For Your Love" and has been described as "gorgeous and lyrically strong", and referred to as the album's best track.

Background and style
The song features triple time rhythm on the drums by Mick Fleetwood and combines with acoustic guitar and electric keyboards. Welch draws upon the use of jazz fourth chords in the song, playing in a minor key, and also features a guitar solo by Bob Weston covering many octaves.

Hypnosis and dreaming are specifically referred to in the lyrics, and Welch also draws upon references to places such as Mexico and North Carolina. According to Welch, the atmosphere of the song was heavily influenced by his residence at the Benifold Mansion in Hampshire, England, a place he described as "rather spooky and strange even in summertime".

In 1978, the song was covered by the Pointer Sisters on their album Energy.

Reception
Donald Brackett, in his 2007 book Fleetwood Mac, 40 Years of Creative Chaos, discussed the album Mystery To Me and the song "Hypnotized", which he described as "a gentle yet compelling hit for Welch on this record". In discussing Fleetwood Mac's change in direction in 1972 and 1973, he describes their stylistic changes as being better received at concerts in the United States, as at the time Americans were more open to them than the British, who were still in heavy demand for blues-oriented rock. Hal Horowitz describes the song as "the highlight of the Mystery to Me album, and undoubtedly one of Bob Welch's most fully realised songs for the band".

In 1999, Welch received an award from ASCAP recognising 25 consecutive years of airplay for "Hypnotized" and "Sentimental Lady".

Personnel
 Bob Welch – lead vocals, acoustic and electric guitar
 Bob Weston – electric guitar solo and rhythm, backing vocals
 Christine McVie – Hohner Pianet N II, keyboards, backing vocals
 John McVie – bass guitar    
 Mick Fleetwood – drums

References

External links
 Hypnotized ranked 643rd in the top 1,000 rock songs, Thompson, Dave. 1000 Songs that Rock Your World. Krause Publications, 2011
 All music guide to rock: the definitive guide to rock, pop, and soul, p. 413
 My Appetite for Destruction: Sex, and Drugs, and Guns N' Roses

Fleetwood Mac songs
The Pointer Sisters songs
1973 songs
Songs written by Bob Welch (musician)
Reprise Records singles